The Islamic Society of Central New York is a "purpose-built" Sunni mosque and Islamic community centre located on Comstock Avenue in Syracuse, NY. Founded in 1981, by Khaja Qutubuddin, the center serves the needs of Central New York's estimated 15,000 - 20,000 Muslims providing various services and outreach programs for the Muslim and non-Muslim community. It also runs an Islamic cemetery and the Madrasat Al Ihsan/School of Excellence (founded in 1993) on West Onondaga Street. The mosque is served by a full-time Imam and is administered by an elected Shura Council.

The mosque is home to a diverse congregation. Over a quarter of the mosque's congregants are African-Americans, one quarter Arabs and one fifth represent South Asia. The remainder are from various parts of the world, with European Muslims (primarily immigrants from Bosnia and Herzegovina and Kosovo, and a much smaller group of White American converts) making up approximately 5% of mosque attendees. Between one and two thirds of the community is estimated to be foreign born.

Purposes and activities 

This society is formed to practice Islam according to the commands of Allah and the Sunnah of Prophet Mohammad in the ways of Sunni principles. The major activities of this corporation revolve around the five daily prayers and teaching members. Members gather at prescribed prayer times for participation in the obligatory prayers. The time of the prayers is related to the position of the sun, and therefore these times change throughout the year depending upon the times of sunset and sunrise.

While the daily obligatory prayers only take 5–10 minutes, generally a short teaching session takes place right after prayer. Every Friday, a major sermon is delivered before the afternoon prayer. Other activities include teaching children about Islamic practices, the timing of such sessions depending upon student availability after school hours. The society also establishes the work of dawah and conveys the message of Islam to people of other faiths, promoting better understanding and harmony in the community at large. Additionally, in the month of Ramadan special prayers and Iftar are arranged for fasting obligations.

Imams of the Islamic Society of Central New York have served on the InterReligious Council of Central New York and as a chaplain at Syracuse University. Outreach activities of members of the mosque include co-founding Women Transcending Boundaries, a group bringing women of faith in central New York together after 9/11, and teaching English classes to refugees at the North Side Learning Center in Syracuse.

See also
 List of mosques in the Americas
 Lists of mosques
 List of mosques in the United States

References

External links

Mosques in New York (state)
Religious buildings and structures in Syracuse, New York
Central New York
Sunni mosques in the United States